Firmin Mattis (born 16 September 1929) is a French alpine skier. He competed in the men's slalom at the 1952 Winter Olympics.

References

1929 births
Living people
French male alpine skiers
Olympic alpine skiers of France
Alpine skiers at the 1952 Winter Olympics
Sportspeople from Savoie